Donald ("Don") Franklin Kardong (born  December 22, 1948) is a noted runner and author from the United States.  He finished fourth in the 1976 Olympic marathon in Montreal.

Biography
Kardong graduated from prestigious college-prep school, Seattle Prep in 1967.  He then went on to earn a bachelor's degree in psychology from Stanford University in 1971. While at Stanford, Kardong ran primarily the 5000 meters (3.1 miles).

In 1974, Kardong earned another bachelor's degree in English and a teaching certificate from the University of Washington in Seattle.  Afterwards, he taught at Spokane's Loma Vista Elementary from 1974-1977. 

In 1976, the 6' 3" Kardong finished 3rd in the United States Olympic Trials held in Eugene, Oregon with a time of 2:13:54. That summer, in Montreal, Kardong finished a close fourth in the men's marathon at the 1976 Summer Olympics, just three seconds behind the bronze medal winner. In 1998, controversy arose concerning steroid use by East German athletes at the 1976 Summer Olympics, including Gold medalist Waldemar Cierpinski. If medals were re-assigned only to drug-free athletes, American Frank Shorter would take the Gold; followed by silver medalist Karel Lismont of Belgian and bronze medalist Don Kardong for Team USA. 

From 1977 to 1986, Kardong owned and operated a retail running store in Spokane; he founded the Lilac Bloomsday Run in 1977.

As a journalist and author, Kardong was a contributing editor for Running magazine from 1980 to 1983, and a contributing editor (1983–1985) and senior writer (1985–1987) for The Runner magazine.  Since 1987, Kardong has been a contributing writer for Runner's World magazine.

Kardong was president of the Road Runners Club of America from 1996 to 2000.  He served as executive director of the Children’s Museum of Spokane from 2002 to 2004, and as race director of the Bloomsday run since then. Kardong started the Bloomsday race in Spokane - the community and a The Spokesman-Review newspaper article prompted the start of the race.

Spokane's Don Kardong Bridge was renamed for him.

Achievements

Books
 Thirty Phone Booths to Boston:  Tales of a Wayward Runner (Macmillan Co., New York, 1985, selected an editor's choice of the American Library Association)
 Bloomsday:  A City In Motion (Cowles Publishing, Spokane, WA, 1989)
 Hills, Hawgs and Ho Chi Minh  (Keokee Co. Publishing, Sandpoint, ID, 1996)

External links
Bloomsday.org - Bloomsday 12k website
DistanceRunning.com - 'Don Kardong' (biography), National Running Hall of Fame

References
General
 More than you'll ever need to know about Don Kardong at Don Kardong's official site (Internet Archive)
Citations

1948 births
American male long-distance runners
Athletes (track and field) at the 1976 Summer Olympics
American male journalists
Living people
Olympic male marathon runners
Olympic track and field athletes of the United States
Stanford Cardinal men's track and field athletes
American male marathon runners